Matthew Halliday may refer to:

Matthew Halliday (footballer), English footballer
Matthew Halliday (racing driver), New Zealand racing driver